The Kefefs or Kifefs, Kefeus is a Greek-made bolt-action sniper rifle designed by Hellenic Arms Industry in 1986 and named after an ancient mythical king. The Kefefs fires rounds chambered in 7.62 × 51 mm NATO.

Design details
The Kefefs rifle contains the following features:
 It has a cold-hammered, high-precision, free-floating, exposed barrel made of special high-grade steel while its receiver, bolt and all metal components are also made of special steel. 
 It uses a simple and robust bolt-action mechanism with a 50° opening angle, enables the bolt to be flexible and easy to open. The third lug of the three locking lugs located at the front of the bolt acts as a rail which gives the bolt a friction-free and smooth movement. 
 The firing mechanism incorporates an extremely quiet, thumb-operated safety the stiffness of which is adjustable.
 Designed by Athan Calligeris Ph.D. with an ergonomically and elegantly designed stock, which is made of high-quality walnut with cross-knurling, is of the Monte Carlo model.
 The trigger pull and travel can also be adjusted. A wide range of telescopic sights and sight mounts is available to suit the user's requirements, since it is the sighting system which plays an important role in sniping. 
 Such scopes are adjustable for windage and elevation. Night vision devices are also available.

The weapon is supplied with a bipod (having a quick release mechanism), a carrying sling and a complete field-service kit.

Variants
There are only two variants of the Kefefs:

 Kefefs-M: A variant of the Kefefs made for military personnel coated with high-strength, heat-resistant camouflage paints with either forest or desert camouflage.
 Kefefs-P: A variant of the Kefefs made for police personnel with a slightly longer, heavier, externally fluted barrel and an oil-polished stock.

Users
: Used by special forces and the Ειδική Κατασταλτική Αντιτρομοκρατική Μονάδα (EKAM) unit of the Hellenic Police, and unit of the Hellenic Army

References

7.62×51mm NATO rifles
Bolt-action rifles
Rifles of Greece
Sniper rifles of Greece